Faysal Quraishi (born October 26, 1973) is a Pakistani actor, producer and television host. He appears in Pakistani television dramas, reality shows and films, and is one of Pakistan's highest-paid actors. He is the recipient of more than 20 nationally recognised awards. He first gained recognition for playing the leading role of Boota in television series Boota from Toba Tek Singh (1999) and has now been a part of more than 200 projects.

He hosted a morning show Muskurati Morning with Faisal Qureshi from 2010 to 2014 on TV One. From 2016 to 2019, he hosted the morning show Salam Zindagi on ARY Zindagi. He was also the host of a game show Jeet Ka Dum on Hum TV and is currently hosting another game show Khush Raho Pakistan on BOL TV. He also turned producer in 2017 with the production house Connect Studios and also owns a film production house Faysal Quraishi Films.

Early life 
Quraishi was born in Lahore, Pakistan. His father belonged to Urdu-speaking community, hailing from Hyderabad Deccan but settled in Lahore, while his mother is a Sindhi-speaking Memon. His mother, Afshan Qureshi, and aunt, Rozina Qureshi, were famous film actresses of their times. Now, his mother appears mostly on the small screen. His father, Abid Qureshi was an actor too, and wanted to see his son achieve great heights as an actor and to prepare him, he enrolled Qureshi into every sport, skill and activity imaginable – horse riding, classical dancing, swimming, cricket and the list goes on. Faysal was just over 17 years old when his father got diagnosed with brain haemorrhage. All their wealth and property was spent on his treatment and that's when Qureshi decided to appear into films, to support his family. Unfortunately, just a month before his movie released, his father died, leaving his wish of seeing his son as a movie star unfulfilled. To this day, this remains Faysal's biggest regret that his father could not witness his success.

Career
Quraishi began his career as a child artist and appeared in the plays Emergency Ward and Andhera Ujala for PTV. He made his film debut as an actor in the 1992 film Saza. He starred in 19 movies over the span of 4 years, but could not create a concrete place for himself, and switched to the smaller screen.

He first played minor roles in television serials before landing his first lead role as "Boota" in Boota from Toba Tek Singh in 1999 which made him an overnight star, then there was no looking back. Faysal has also appeared as a judge on competition shows Dum Hai To Entertain Kar  and Nachle. He also hosted the reality show Hero Banney Ki Tarang and the morning show Muskurati Morning on TV One. He also played a variety of characters in many critically acclaimed dramas, including Meri Zaat Zarra-e-Benishan (2009), Meri Ansuni Kahani (2009), Masuri (2005), Roag (2014), Main Abdul Qadir Hoon (2010), Qaid-e-Tanhai (2010), and Kis Din Mera Viyah Howay Ga (2011–2018), Rang Laaga (2015), Muqaddar (2020), and many others. In 2018, he was seen in a revenge based drama series Khalish. Faysal also played the leading role in the 2014's critically and commercially acclaimed drama serial Bashar Momin, which was the first Pakistani drama to air on Indian television.

In 2015, Daily Pakistan reported that Faysal has become one of the highest-paid artists of television, charging Rs. 3 million per episode and continues to be one of the most sought after and highest paid actors in Pakistan today.

From 2016 to 2019, Faysal hosted the morning show Salam Zindagi which aired on ARY Zindagi. Qureshi was appointed as a CLF Goodwill Ambassador by the Children's Literature Festival on 30 July 2019.

Filmography

Films

Television

Other appearances

Awards and recognition

See also
 List of Pakistani actors
 List of people from Lahore
 Kis Din Mera Viyah Howay Ga
 Kis Din Mera Viyah Howay Ga (season 04)

References

External links
 
 
 

1973 births
Living people
People from Lahore
Punjabi people
Pakistani male film actors
Pakistani male child actors
Pakistani male television actors
Pakistani television hosts
Lux Style Award winners
Male actors in Urdu cinema